Jagathala is a panchayat town in The Nilgiris district in the Indian state of Tamil Nadu.

Demographics
 India census, Jegathala had a population of 14,383. Males constitute 49% of the population and females 51%. Jegathala has an average literacy rate of 79%, higher than the national average of 59.5%; male literacy is 86%, and female literacy is 73%; 9% of the population are under 6 years of age. There are about 400 household in this village. 

Jegathala is one of the panchayat towns in Nilgiris, located at an altitude of 1,850 m above sea level. It is 7 km from Coonoor and 13 km from Ooty.

References

Cities and towns in Nilgiris district